Cato Tom Andersen (born June 17, 1967) is a Norwegian former ice hockey defenceman. He was born in Oslo, Norway.

Andersen played in the Norwegian Eliteserien for Furuset and Vålerenga. He also played for the Norwegian national ice hockey team, playing in four Ice Hockey World Championships as well as the 1988 and 1994 Winter Olympics.

References

External links

1967 births
Living people
Furuset Ishockey players
Ice hockey players at the 1988 Winter Olympics
Ice hockey players at the 1994 Winter Olympics
Norwegian ice hockey defencemen
Olympic ice hockey players of Norway
Spektrum Flyers players
Ice hockey people from Oslo
Vålerenga Ishockey players